The Dandenong Cricket Club is an Australian cricket club based in Dandenong, Victoria, an outer-city suburb of Melbourne. They play in Victorian Premier Cricket, the highest competition in the state.

History
In 1989, Hawthorn/East Melbourne relocated to Glen Waverley in the eastern suburbs, and was later renamed Hawthorn/Waverley in 1994. The move of Hawthorn/East Melbourne caused Waverley to move to Dandenong, and the new team played as Waverley/Dandenong, but dropped Waverley from its name for the 1994–95 season. Dandenong currently use Shepley Oval as their home ground.

The club's most successful season came in 2006/7 when it won its first Premier Cricket Premiership. The side included Peter Siddle, Darren Pattinson and Warren Ayres.

Dandenong won its second flag in 2010/11 vs. Frankston Heat.  Siddle, Darren and James Pattinson all played for Dandenong in the final and their individual efforts went a long way to Dandenong claiming the Premiership.

Dandenong won a third premiership in 2017/18, defeating Fitzroy Doncaster in the final, with Siddle named man of the match in the final.

International players from Dandenong 
Peter Siddle
Darren Pattinson
Cameron White
Ian Harvey
James Pattinson

References

External links
Dandenong Cricket Club website
Victorian Premier Cricket website

Victorian Premier Cricket clubs
Cricket clubs in Melbourne
Dandenong, Victoria
Sport in the City of Greater Dandenong